12th century in music – 13th century in music – 1300s in music

Events
c.1206 – A Minnesang contest, the Sängerkrieg auf der Wartburg, is held in Eisenach.
1221 – the Vienna city laws (renewed in 1244) declared itinerant minstrels to have no legal rights, while minstrels resident in a parish were exempted and therefore were able to develop organizations within the framework of municipal law.
1254 – Alfonso X of Castile establishes a chair of music at the University of Salamanca.
1259 – An organ is installed in the Cathedral of Worms.

Bands formed
1212. The Thomanerchor is founded in Leipzig.

Treatises
1271 – Amerus, Practica artis musicae.
1274 – Elias Salomo, Scientia artis musicae.
1279 – Anonymous of St Emmeram, De musica mensurata (Munich, Bayerische Staatsbibliothek, Cod. Lat. Mon. [Cim.] 14523), one of the two main treatises on the theory of Notre Dame polyphony.

Compositions
1201 – Raimbaut de Vaqueiras, "Ara pot hom conoisser e proar" (chanson de croisade, celebrating the election of Boniface de Monferrat as leader of the Fourth Crusade)
1204–05 – Raimbaut de Vaqueiras, "No·m agrad' iverns ni pascors"
1227–34 – A Play of Daniel with music is written at the school of Beauvais Cathedral.
1235–39 – Theobald I of Navarre, "Seignor, sachiés, qui or ne s’en ira" (chanson de croisade)
1239 – Theobald I of Navarre, "Au tens plain de felonie" (chanson de croisade)
1239–40 – Theobald I of Navarre, "Li dous penser et li dous souvenir" (chanson de croisade)

Births
1201
30 May – Thibaut IV, Count of Champagne and Brie, King of Navarre (d. 7 July 1253)
date unknown – Richart de Fournival, French trouvère (d. 1260)
1216
date unknown – Safi al-Din al-Urmawi, musician and theorist (d. 1296)
1217
date unknown – John I, Duke of Brittany, French trouvère (d. 1286)
1221
23 November – Alfonso X of Castile, Spanish monarch, poet, and composer (d. 1284)
1291
31 October – Philippe de Vitry, French composer, music theorist, and poet (d. 1361)

Deaths
1201 – Léonin (died this year or soon after)
1203
May or June – Le Chastelain de Couci, French trouvère
1204
12 December – Maimonides, Jewish rabbi and writer on music (b. 1135 or 1138)
1207
4 September – Raimbaut de Vaqueiras, troubadour (b. c.1155)
1231
25 December – Folquet de Marseille, troubadour (b. c.1155)
date unknown – Folquet de Marselha, troubadour
1236
26 December – Philip the Chancellor (b. c.1165)
1245
date unknown – Guillaume le Vinier, French trouvère (b. c.1190)
1253
7 July – Thibaut IV, Count of Champagne and Brie, King of Navarre (b. 30 May 1201)
1260
date unknown – Richart de Fournival, French trouvère
1284
4 April – Alfonso X of Castile
1286
date unknown – John I, Duke of Brittany, French trouvère (b. 1217)
1288 – Adam de la Halle (possibly survived until at least 1306)

References